Sadya Afreen Mallick is a Bangladeshi singer and journalist. She is an exponent of Nazrul Geeti. She is editor of the Arts and Entertainment section of The Daily Star.

Background and career
Mallick was born to Syed Moqsud Ali and Nurun Nahar Faizannesa, both professors of the University of Dhaka. She was a child artiste to perform live when Bangladesh Television was launched 1964. She was one of the early women entrepreneurs in block printing.
Mallick accompanied singer Firoza Begum as a performer on a three-month tour of the US in 1990. Begum had also directed Mallick's Nazrul Sangeet album at HMV, India in 1992.

Awards
 Chhayanaut Gold Medal (1974)
 Anandadhara Gold Medal (1986)
 Nazrul Award (2015)

References

Living people
20th-century Bangladeshi women singers
20th-century Bangladeshi singers
Bangladeshi Nazrul Geeti singers
Year of birth missing (living people)